The Djavshangoz Important Bird Area, also spelt Dzhavshangoz, is a 345 km2 tract of land in southern Gorno-Badakhshan Autonomous Province in eastern Tajikistan. It has been identified by BirdLife International as an Important Bird Area (IBA).

Description
The site lies  some 110 km east of the provincial capital of Khorog in the Pamir Mountains.  The most important features within the IBA are the Djavshangoz and Turumtaykul valleys.  The Djavshangoz valley is 3400 m above sea level and forms a wide plain between the Shungan and Shakhdara ridges.  In the middle section of the valley, river floods create islands which attract waterbirds.  The Turumtaykul valley is 4500 m above sea level and divides the Shungan ridge into northern and southern parts. Turumtaykul lake is located in the central part of the valley and forms the core zone of the IBA. Much of the site is used as pasture, with arable land being scarce. Two settlements within the IBA, Djavshangoz and Barchid, have a combined population of about 750.

Birds
The site qualifies as an IBA because it supports significant numbers of the populations of various bird species, either as residents, or as breeding or passage migrants.  These include Himalayan snowcocks, ruddy shelducks, common mergansers, saker falcons, Himalayan vultures, cinereous vultures, yellow-billed choughs, Hume's larks, sulphur-bellied warblers, wallcreepers, Himalayan rubythroats, white-winged redstarts, white-winged snowfinches, alpine accentors, rufous-streaked accentors, brown accentors, water pipits, plain mountain finches, black-headed mountain finches, crimson-winged finches, red-mantled rosefinches, Caucasian great rosefinches and red-fronted rosefinches.

References

Important Bird Areas of Tajikistan
Gorno-Badakhshan Autonomous Region